The 1986–87 Coppa Italia, the 40th Coppa Italia was an Italian Football Federation domestic cup competition won by Napoli.

Group stage

Group 1

Group 2

Group 3

Group 4

Group 5

Group 6

Group 7

Group 8

Round of 16 

p=after penalty shoot-out

Quarter-finals 

p=after penalty shoot-out

Semi-finals

Final

First leg

Second leg

Napoli won 4–0 on aggregate.

Top goalscorers

References 

 Official site
 Bracket

Coppa Italia seasons
Coppa Italia
Coppa Italia